Bub is an Indian film in Kashmiri language directed by Jyoti Sarup. It was released in Jammu on 1 December 2001. It is the third Kashmiri film, the preceding one was released 38 years previously. The film won the Nargis Dutt Award for Best Feature Film on National Integration at the 49th National Film Awards. The film is based on the Wandhama Massacre, where several Kashmiri Pandits were killed by militants before Republic Day on 26 January and focuses on a family that was massacred.

Cast 
 K. K. Raina ... Shiban Lal
 Kuber Sarup  ... Vinod
 Virendra Razdan  ... Vinod's uncle
 Raju Kher ... Neighbor
 Yogesh Kilam  ... Shiban's younger brother
 Meenakshi Koul  ... Neighbor's daughter

Reaction 
Bub was greeted with a positive response from the media. The Hindu said that the film "describes the pain of a Kashmiri boy who lost his parents" and it also "gives an insight into the various aspects of Kashmiri society, culture". Radio Kashmir praised the performances, saying "Mr. K.K.Raina, whose character runs throughout the movie, has done an excellent job". Praising the newcomer it said, "The young Kuber Sarup, 14 years old, does a very superb restrained part".

Awards
National Award
Nargis Dutt Award for Best Feature Film on National Integration

References

2001 films
Kashmiri-language films
Best Film on National Integration National Film Award winners
Films set in Jammu and Kashmir
Kashmir conflict in films
National Film Development Corporation of India films